The Oxford Encyclopedia of Ancient Egypt, edited by Donald B. Redford and published in three volumes by Oxford University Press in 2001, contains 600 articles that cover the 4,000 years of the history of Ancient Egypt, from the predynastic era to the seventh century CE. Articles cover art, architecture, religion, language, literature, politics, trade, everyday social life, and court culture in the Nile Valley.

Awards

2001 Choice Outstanding Academic Title
2001 Library Journal Best Reference
2002 American Library Association (ALA)/RUSA Dartmouth Medal Outstanding Reference Source
2002 Association of American Publishers Best Multivolume Reference, Humanities

References

2001 non-fiction books
Encyclopedia Of Ancient Egypt
Encyclopedias of history
Egyptology
African encyclopedias
21st-century encyclopedias